Lucas Henrique Turci is a Brazilian footballer who currently plays for Memphis 901 in the USL Championship.

Career 
Turci played at youth level with various clubs in Brazil including São Paulo, Corinthians, and Cruzeiro. He then moved to Germany, playing at various lower levels, including spells with  1. CfR Pforzheim and Union Fürstenwalde.

On 11 March 2022, Turci signed for USL Championship club Memphis 901 ahead of their 2022 season.

References 

1998 births
Living people
Brazilian footballers
Brazilian expatriate footballers
FSV Union Fürstenwalde players
Memphis 901 FC players
USL Championship players
Expatriate footballers in Germany
Expatriate soccer players in the United States
Brazilian expatriate sportspeople in Germany
Brazilian expatriate sportspeople in the United States
Association football defenders
Regionalliga players